Angle Peak may refer to:

 Angle Peak (Alberta), a mountain in Canada
 Angle Peak (Antarctica), a mountain in Palmer Land, Antarctica